New England Tablelands (code NET), an interim Australian bioregion, is located mainly in New South Wales, comprising , of which  or 95.23 per cent of the bioregion lies within New South Wales; and the residual within Queensland. This bioregion is one of the smaller bioregions in NSW, occupying 3.57 per cent of the state.

In terms of plants, the region is dominated by stringy bark/box/peppermint species, including Eucalyptus caliginosa, E. nova-anglica, E. melliodora and E. blakelyi.

Subregions
In the IBRA system it has the code of (NET), and it has nineteen sub-regions:

References

Further reading
 Thackway, R and I D Cresswell (1995) An interim biogeographic regionalisation for Australia : a framework for setting priorities in the National Reserves System Cooperative Program Version 4.0 Canberra : Australian Nature Conservation Agency, Reserve Systems Unit, 1995.

See also

Biogeography of New South Wales
Biogeography of Queensland
Eastern Australian temperate forests
IBRA regions